Eugene Taylor (28 October 1946 – 30 January 2013) was a scholar on William James and a professor of psychology at Saybrook University and Harvard University.

Biography
Taylor was educated at Southern Methodist University and Harvard Divinity School, and Boston University (PhD in the History and Philosophy of Psychology). He was the 1983 William James Lecturer at Harvard Divinity School.
Taylor died in 2013 and was the subject of many remembrances and obituaries. Taylor held the rank of yondan (4th degree black belt) and was the founder the Harvard Aikido Club in 1981 and a shidoin (instructor) in the United States Aikido Federation. In 1993 he founded the Cambridge Institute of Psychology and Comparative Religions; was a  founding member of The New Existentialists; and was the Vice President of the Massachusetts Association of Swedenborgian Churches (see Church of the New Jerusalem (Cambridge, Massachusetts)). Dr. Taylor was Senior Psychologist in the Department of Psychiatry at Massachusetts General Hospital (appointed official historian) and Lecturer in Psychiatry, Harvard Medical School.

Taylor was known for the size and scope of his personal library of an estimated 8000 volumes.

Publications
Books authored or edited by Taylor include

References

1946 births
2013 deaths
Psychologists of religion
20th-century American psychologists
Harvard Divinity School alumni
Boston University alumni
Southern Methodist University alumni
Historians of psychology